Al-Zayani is a Sunni Muslim family mainly situated in Bahrain, Saudi Arabia, and Kuwait. Large numbers of the family in Bahrain came as early as the mid-19th century with the Utub tribe, which also members the Al-Khalifa, the royal family in the Kingdom of Bahrain. There are large numbers of the Al-Zayani family in southeastern Saudi Arabia and parts of Riyadh as well.

A famous member of Al-Zayani family is the famous Saudi coach Khalil Al-Zayani and Abdullatif bin Rashid Al Zayani, foreign minister of Bahrain.

History
The Zayani family is from the Bani Adwan Tribe. The name Zayani is believed to be derived from a village called "Zayanh", the hometown of the family on the outskirts of Mecca. Hence the Al-Zayani name. They have been known as businessmen since the start of the 20th  century. The boom of Pearl Diving helped mold the family's reputation in Bahrain. The family has multiple car dealerships, construction, travel, and various other businesses.

References

Tribes of Arabia
Tribes of Saudi Arabia
Arabic-language surnames
Bahraini Sunni Muslims
Bahraini families